The European Soundmix Show was an imitation talent competition held yearly from 1996 to 1999, with two special shows in 2001 and 2002.

The show was an international version of Joop van den Ende's "Henny Huisman Soundmixshow", which was aired on Dutch television the first time in 1985.

Various European countries competed with one participant each imitating a famous artist, and most often, the participant was the winner of the national competition the same or the previous year. Some participants were, however, chosen internally by the national television company, without any pre-selection.

The winner was chosen by a jury vote. Every country sent two jury members (except for 1996 when it was only one member), which together awarded their top-4 countries 5, 3, 2 and 1 point(s).

Participation
Listed are all the countries that have taken part in the competition, alongside the year in which they made their debut:

Winners

Competitions

1996
The first European Soundmix Show was held in Amsterdam, the Netherlands on 27 April 1996. It was produced by Endemol and the host of the show was Linda de Mol.

1997
The second European Soundmix Show was held in Amsterdam, the Netherlands on 19 April 1997. It was produced by Endemol and the host of the show was Linda Evans.

1998
The third European Soundmix Show was held in Amsterdam, the Netherlands on 25 April 1998. It was produced by Endemol and the hosts of the show were Bobbie Eakes and Jeff Trachta.

1999
The fourth European Soundmix Show was held in Amsterdam, the Netherlands on 22 May 1999. It was produced by Endemol and the host of the show was Linda de Mol.

2001
The fifth European Soundmix Show was held in Manchester, the United Kingdom on 14 April 2001. The show was called Stars in Euro Eyes 2001, and was made mainly for the British television audience. It was produced by ITV Productions, and the presenter was Matthew Kelly.

2002
The sixth European Soundmix Show was held in Manchester, the United Kingdom on 26 October and 2 November 2002. The show was called Stars in Their Eyes European Championships 2002, and was made mainly for the British television audience. It was produced by ITV Productions, and the host was Matthew Kelly.

See also
Stars in Their Eyes

References

European Soundmix Show
Singing talent shows
Television series by Endemol
Television series by ITV Studios
1990s Dutch television series
2000s Dutch television series
1996 Dutch television series debuts
2002 Dutch television series endings
2000s British television series
2000 British television series debuts
2002 British television series endings
British television specials